Louis Adams (born 21 January 1990) is a Senegalese basketball player who currently plays for ASC Ville de Dakar of the Nationale 1 and .

Professional career
Adams played in Spain for CB Tormes in the LEB Silver in the 2018–19 season. In February 2020, Adams returned to the Senegalese champions AS Douanes. The Douanes play in the Basketball Africa League (BAL).

In December 2021, Adams joined ASC Ville de Dakar for the 2022 season.

International career

BAL career statistics

|-
| style="text-align:left;"|2021
| style="text-align:left;"|AS Douanes
| 1 || 0 || 7.3 || .333 || .000 || – || 1.0 || .0 || .0 || .0 || 4.0
|-
|- class="sortbottom"
| style="text-align:center;" colspan="2"|Career
| 1 || 0 || 7.3 || .333 || .000 || – || 1.0 || .0 || .0 || .0 || 4.0

References

1990 births
Living people
AS Douanes basketball players
Junior college men's basketball players in the United States
Point guards
Senegalese expatriate basketball people in Spain
Senegalese expatriate basketball people in the United States
Senegalese men's basketball players
South Carolina State Bulldogs basketball players
Basketball players from Dakar